Mario Gómez Daza (19 January 1907 – 14 May 1971) was a Mexican sprinter who competed in the 1928 Summer Olympics. He was born in Mexico City.

References

1907 births
1971 deaths
Mexican male sprinters
Athletes from Mexico City
Olympic athletes of Mexico
Athletes (track and field) at the 1928 Summer Olympics
Central American and Caribbean Games gold medalists for Mexico
Central American and Caribbean Games bronze medalists for Mexico
Competitors at the 1926 Central American and Caribbean Games
Competitors at the 1930 Central American and Caribbean Games
Central American and Caribbean Games medalists in athletics
20th-century Mexican people